Rabbit Run is a tributary of Marten Creek in Sanders County, Montana in the United States.

Statistics
The Geographic Name Information System I.D. is 789315.

References

Rivers of Montana